WLQY (1320 kHz) is a commercial AM radio station licensed to Hollywood, Florida, and serving Greater Miami. The station has a Haitian Creole music and information radio format and is owned by Entravision Holdings, LLC.  The studios and offices are on NE 125th Street in North Miami.

Technical
WLQY broadcasts with 5,000 watts, using a directional antenna at all times.  By day it employs a two-tower array and at night a four-tower array is used.  The transmitter is off Sheridan Street in Hollywood.

History

"The Million Dollar Sound of WGMA" began in the mid-1960s as a middle of the road station.  It was a daytimer, required to go off the air at night, and broadcast with only 1,000 watts.  Artists included Frank Sinatra, Nat King Cole, Barbra Streisand and Dean Martin.

It later switched to country music as WGMA "The Country Giant."  The power was boosted to 5,000 watts around the clock, using a four-tower directional pattern, day and night. See History of WGMA The Country Giant, 1967-79  WGMA was located at the Hollywood Federal building on Washington Street and 441, and the transmitter was at 9881 Sheridan Street.

Singles-only station WADY "The Lady", went on the air on March 1, 1980. On July 1, 1980, the station changed its call sign to the current WLQY.

WLQY, first known as "Lucky 13", used the syndicated "Music Of Your Life" adult standards format.

References

External links
 

 History of WGMA The Country Giant, 1967-79 from South Florida Radio History web site
 Gary Lawrence/GLP Music WLQY Bandleader
 

LQY
Radio stations established in 1953
1953 establishments in Florida
Hollywood, Florida
Entravision Communications stations